Volynka is a rural locality (a settlement) and the administrative center of Vayskoye Rural Settlement, Krasnovishersky District, Perm Krai, Russia. The population was 52 as of 2010. There are 5 streets.

Geography 
Volynka is located 40 km east of Krasnovishersk (the district's administrative centre) by road. Visherogorsk is the nearest rural locality.

References 

Rural localities in Krasnovishersky District